Icius insolidus is a jumping spider species in the genus Icius.

Etymology
The species name derives from the Latin for undurable, insolidus.

Taxonomy
Originally placed in the genus Menemerus by Wanda Wesołowska in 1999, the species was moved to Icius in 2006.

Distribution
Icius insolidus has been found in Namibia and South Africa.

References

Spiders described in 1999
Fauna of Namibia
Salticidae
Spiders of Africa
Spiders of South Africa
Taxa named by Wanda Wesołowska